Clayton Hamilton (born June 15, 1982) is a retired American pitcher for the Yokohama DeNA BayStars.

Biography
From Penn State University, he was selected by the San Diego Padres in the 17th Round (492nd overall) of the 2004 amateur entry draft. He was signed by scout Josh Boyd. 

On December 8, 2005, he was sent by the San Diego Padres to the Pittsburgh Pirates as a player to be named later in a November 21, 2005 trade. On December 6, 2007, he was picked up in the Minor League phase of the Rule 5 Draft by the Texas Rangers. Hamilton split 2008 between the Bakersfield Blaze and Frisco RoughRiders. In 2009, he worked with Frisco and the Oklahoma City RedHawks.

In 2005, Hamilton won the Fort Wayne Wizards' "Pitcher/Prospect of the Year" award, and was selected for the Eastern Division's All-Star team.

Nippon Professional Baseball
In October 2010, Hamilton traveled to Yokohama, Japan to try out with the Yokohama BayStars of the Nippon Professional Baseball league.

In November 2010, Hamilton signed a 1-year contract with the Baystars 

Following the 2011 Tōhoku earthquake and tsunami, Hamilton was allowed to return to the United States while the NPB figured out the fate of the season.  Clayton decided to return to Japan after discussions with his family.

References

External links

Yokohama BayStars Players Directory
Clayton Hamilton Twitter
Baseball Prospectus Interview Podcast

Living people
1982 births
Arizona League Padres players
Eugene Emeralds players
Fort Wayne Wizards players
Lake Elsinore Storm players
Lynchburg Hillcats players
Bakersfield Blaze players
Frisco RoughRiders players
People from Beaver Falls, Pennsylvania
Yokohama BayStars players
Yokohama DeNA BayStars players
American expatriate baseball players in Japan
Penn State Nittany Lions baseball players
Baseball players from Pennsylvania